Well Hung Heart was an American rock band formed in Orange, California in 2011 by Greta Valenti and Robin Davey. The band operate under their own label, GROW VISION MUSIC a subsidiary of their media company, GROW VISION and create everything from the videos to tour bookings.

Career 
In 2011 Well Hung Heart started by building an online presence, releasing a series of rehearsal videos and songs. Their first printed release, "The State of America" sold out almost immediately. It contained a real dollar bill each uniquely defaced by the band as part of the artwork. In 2011, the band were asked to perform at Hoaxfest in the UK and Europe including shows at London's O2 Academy in Islington with British Blues band The Hoax. In 2012 Well Hung Heart strengthened their online presence releasing a number of music videos, produced and directed by the band themselves, and grow their tumblr followers to over 120,000. In 2013 Well Hung Heart's music video "Devil" was nominated for Best Music Video at the O.C. Music Awards alongside No Doubt and Dirty Heads. Throughout 2015 & 2016, the group released a self-titled EP, “Well Hung Heart”, earning them 16 weeks of airplay (6 weeks at #1) with their single "Touch The Sky" on KROQ FM’s Locals Only Show hosted by DJ Kat Corbett. For their single "Touch The Sky", Well Hung Heart created one of the first 360 VR Music Videos earning them over half a million views on Facebook.

Discography

E.P.s / "Mix Tapes"

The Rehearsal Tapes Vol.01 (2011)
The State of America EP (2011)
Well Hung Heart (Self-Titled) (2015)

L.P.s

Young Enough To Know It All (2013)
Go Forth and Multiply (2014)

Series 
Well Hung Heart are the creators of the series "Made In 48". It is a web-based music show in which Well Hung Heart invite guests over to their house, and together they create a new song and music video. The music video and song is then released, all in the space of 48 hours. Episode 01 was premiered in February 2013 and features guests Gram Rabbit.

Film Work 
Band members Greta Valenti and Robin Davey also own the creative agency GROW VISION. They have designed and created hundreds of videos for brands and music videos for other rock artists such as Bush, Papa Roach, Jet, Buckcherry, Drowning Pool. In 2012, they also took over the Production of the Palladia/MTV Live television show "Live from Daryl's House", with Robin Davey as Director and Greta Valenti Producer. The show is hosted and created by Daryl Hall from Hall and Oates. Robin is also the Director of the award-winning documentary "The Canary Effect" and was awarded the Stanley Kubrick Award for Innovative Filmmaking at the Tribeca Film Festival by Michael Moore.

Awards / Accolades

OC Music Awards 
The OC Music Awards is an annual awards ceremony established in 2000 and held in Orange County (California). Well Hung Heart has won two awards from four nominations.

|-
| style="text-align:center;"| 2013 || Devil (song)  || Music Video || 
|-
| rowspan="3" style="text-align:center;"| 2014 || Well Hung Heart || Best Rock || 
|-
| Well Hung Heart || Best Live Band || 
|-
|  Bulls#!t (song) || Best Music Video || 
|}

References

Rock music groups from California
Musical groups from Orange County, California
Musical groups established in 2011
2011 establishments in California